Eskimo Joe is the second extended play by Australian band, Eskimo Joe, released in July 1999. The EP peaked at number 94 on the ARIA Charts.

"Turn Up Your Stereo" and "Ruby Wednesday" received plenty of airplay on Australian youth radio station Triple J reaching #39 and #99 respectively on the Triple J Hottest 100 of 1999.

Track listing

Charts

Release history

References

Eskimo Joe albums
EPs by Australian artists
1999 EPs